Betts Park (also known as King George's Field) is a public park in Penge, London Borough of Bromley, in London, England.  It is approximately 13 acres (5 hectares) and has a number of attractions, including part of the old Croydon Canal.  It was opened in December 1928 and extended throughout the 1930s.

Location
Betts Park is in the Anerley area of Penge and is publicly owned. The park's main entrances are from Anerley Road. There are other entrances from Weighton Road, Seymour Villas, Croydon Road, and Betts Way.

History
The land where Betts Park now stands originally contained a semi-enclosed coppice on Penge Common known as Clay Copse. In 1827 the entire common was auctioned with lots sold for development. Residential houses and a church were erected encircling the coppice with the woodland divided into gardens, with the exception of a small area in the southeast corner believed to have contained the wagon home of Betty Saville, the last tenant of Penge Common, and an area in the southwest where tennis courts were built.

The public park was initially created from a house and land on the north side of the park donated by Mr. Frederick Betts, a local property owner. The house, a Victorian villa known as Oak Lawn, became a public library and the gardens became recreation grounds. Betts Park was opened in December 1928 and named in memory of Frederick's late mother, Sarah Betts. Within a few years, Penge Urban District Council purchased additional land and the remains of the Croydon Canal. In June 1937 the park was further increased in size with the addition of land to the southeastern side by the King George's Fields Foundation memorial trust. The park is now legally protected from development by Deeds of Dedication from Fields in Trust.

Betts Park contains one of the last remnants of the short-lived Croydon Canal, a Millennium Rock (a boulder of Lewisian Gneiss gifted by the people of Lochinver in Scotland) and veteran holm oak believed to be a survivor of Penge Common.

On 2 November 2017, Michael Jonas, a 17-year-old boy, was stabbed and killed in the park. On 12 July 2020 Dean Edwards was shot and killed at the Croydon Road entrance to the park. As at July 2022, neither crime has resulted in a successful prosecution.

In the extreme heatwave of July 2022, the grass to the north of the park discoloured to reveal a ghost image of Oak Lawn villa, which had been demolished in the late 1960s.

Facilities
Facilities in the park now include a football pitch, an outdoor gym, basketball court, goal posts, skateboard area and children's play area. There is also a pre-school daycare centre for children in the former tennis pavilion building.

Friends
London Borough of Bromley offers a scheme for locals to become a part of a friend group for the many parks. These groups are made up of volunteers who want to help discuss how the local parks are maintained, used, and developed. Friends of Betts Park is part of this scheme.

References

External links
 Streetmap.co.uk
 Research from Family Grows on Trees
 A Penge walk
 Virtual Penge
 Penge forum
 Penge Historical Images
 Friends of Betts Park

1928 establishments in England
Parks and open spaces in the London Borough of Bromley